Science Museums, Aarhus, founded 1 January 2008, is an umbrella organization comprising the Steno Museum, the greenhouses at Aarhus Botanical Gardens, the Ole Rømer Observatory and a herbarium in Aarhus, Denmark. The Science Museums works as an independent institution under the Science and Technology department of Aarhus University.

The museums 
Although the name implies the institutions to be museums, this is not to be taken too literally apparently, as some of them certainly have their focus elsewhere.

The Greenhouses 

Situated in the Aarhus Botanical Gardens in the inner city since 1970  the Greenhouses have seen a heavy renovation and expansion from 2011 to 2014. As the surrounding botanical gardens, the Greenhouses have changed focus from an academic research- and study-ground (with public access) to public outreach, events and education, but with the same diversity of plants.

There is a café, shop and educational facilities at the Greenhouses.

Ole Rømer Observatory 

Built in 1911, the Ole Rømer Observatory  is an astronomical observatory named after the famous astronomer Ole Rømer. It was initiated in 1908 by the German astronomer Friedrich Krüger - with the help of Danish astronomer Victor Nielsen -, when he offered to relocate from Altenburg in Thüringen to Aarhus with his instruments, if the city council could present a building to house them. After a signed agreement, the Aarhus City Council initiated the construction project and choose the renowned Anton Rosen as architect. The buildings were listed by the former Danish Cultural Heritage Agency in 2006, as a fine and unique example of Danish Art Nouveau.

The observatory is situated in a small park, enclosed by tall trees, shading out the light pollution from the city somewhat. In association with the observatory itself, are recently restored buildings for housing guests to the Aarhus University.

The Ole Rømer Observatory has been part of Aarhus University right from the university's foundation in 1928 and it has always facilitated education, public outreach and research opportunities, as part of the original agreement. The observatory offers presentations and discussions on a broad array of astronomical topics on selected evenings and when the sky is clear (usually in autumn and winter), the observatory's two modern 11-inch Schmidt-Cassegrain telescopes are employed.

The Herbarium 
The herbarium is a research-oriented plant collection of more than 750,000 preserved specimens from all over the world, established in 1963. Only researchers can gain physical access to the herbarium, but more than 136,000 samples have been digitized and is available on-line in a public database.

Steno Museum 

Named after scientist and scholar Nicolas Steno (1638-1686), the Steno Museum is located in the southern part of the University Park  where it opened in 1994 in a brand new building. The building is dedicated to house the museum and was constructed from the characteristic yellow bricks, using the same architectural features of the original university buildings on the campus surrounding it.

The Steno Museum is the institution best fitting the term "museum". Dedicated to tell the history of science and medicine, the Steno Museum attracts a diverse audience of all kinds and ages, from school classes coming here to learn and work with the displayed scholarly subjects, to adult groups and random individual visitors. It has its main focus on school and high school classes though. Apart from the permanent exhibitions, the museum regularly displays themed temporary exhibitions as well.

The Steno Museum also includes a planetarium, an outdoor herbal garden with medicinal plants, a café and a shop.

References

Sources 
 Science Museums Official homepage.

External links 

Museums in Aarhus
Aarhus University
Tourist attractions in Aarhus
2008 establishments in Denmark
Science museums in Denmark
Museums in the Central Denmark Region
University museums in Denmark